WWIII – Unklesounds vs. U.N.K.L.E is a 2004 compilation DJ remix album by U.N.K.L.E.

Track listing 
cd1 - Unkle vs. Unkle - Never Never Land Throw Down (43'14)
 "Intro" 0'20
 Rare Earth - "Get Ready" 2'07
 Queens Of The Stone Age - "No One Knows" (Unkle Reconstruction) 6'37
 Unkle - "Blackout" 3'15
 Howie B. - "Hey Jack" (Unkle Metamorphosis Mix) 7'51
 DJ Shadow - "GDMFSOB" (Unkle Uncensored Mix) 5'58
 Unkle - "Reign" 5'47
 Dead Prez - "Hip Hop" (Unkle Remix) 4'58
 Ian Brown - "F.E.A.R." (Unkle Reconstruction) 6'21

cd2 - James Lavelle vs. The Scratch Perverts – Psyence Fiction Turntable Reconstruction (52'56)
 "Intro" 0'20
 Unkle - "Unkle (Main Title Theme)" (Live) 2'23
 Unkle - "Lonely Soul" (Live) 4'29
 Unkle - "Guns Blazing (Drums Of Death Part 1)" / "The Knock (Drums Of Death Part 2)" (Live) 8'02
 The Scratch Perverts - "The March Of The General" 2'20
 The Scratch Perverts - "Scratch Interlude 1" 2'12
 Unkle - "Celestial Annihilation" (Live) 4'04
 Unkle - "Bloodstain" (Live) 2'55
 Unkle - "Nursery Rhyme" (Live) 3'16
 The Scratch Perverts - "Scratch Interlude 2" 2'21
 Unkle - "Be There" (Live Part 1) 1'13
 Unkle - "Unreal" (Scratch Perverts Reconstruction) 5'32
 Unkle - "Rabbit In Your Headlights" (Live) 5'52
 The Scratch Perverts - "Scratch Interlude 3" 2'28
 Unkle - "Be There" (Live Part 2) 5'17
 "Outro" 0'14

2004 remix albums
Unkle albums